The Battle of Catalán was fought between the Luso-Brazilian forces under the command of Luís Teles da Silva Caminha e Meneses, the Marquis of Alegrete, and the artiguistas commanded by Andrés Latorre in Arroyo Catalán, present-day Uruguay.

The troops under the command of the Marquis of Alegrete consisted of 1,200 soldiers of infantry, cavalry and artillery of the São Paulo Legion (Portuguese: Legião de São Paulo) from the Brazilian province of São Paulo, 1,300 soldiers of cavalry from the Brazilian São Pedro do Rio Grande do Sul province and 11 cannons.

The battle ended with a Luso-Brazilian victory.

References

Citations

Bibliography

External links
 A Legião de Tropas Ligeiras na Campanha de 1816-1820

Battles involving Portugal
Battles involving Brazil
Conflicts in 1816
1816 in Portugal
1816 in Brazil
1816 in Uruguay
Catalán